Summer in the Southeast is the first live album by singer-songwriter Bonnie 'Prince' Billy (Will Oldham). It was released in 2005 on Drag City.

Track listing
 "Master and Everyone" - 3:40
 "Pushkin" - 4:15
 "Blokbuster" - 4:19
 "Wolf Among Wolves" - 3:56
 "May It Always Be" - 3:03
 "Break of Day" - 5:16
 "A Sucker's Evening" - 4:00
 "Nomadic Revery" - 3:16
 "I See a Darkness" - 4:29
 "O Let It Be" - 4:02
 "Beast for Thee" - 4:13
 "Death to Everyone" - 5:45
 "Even If Love" - 2:58
 "I Send My Love to You" - 2:19
 "Take However Long You Want" - 4:00
 "Madeleine Mary" - 4:01
 "Ease Down the Road" - 4:22

References

Will Oldham albums
2005 live albums
Drag City (record label) live albums